A Town Called Bastard (also known as A Town Called Hell on DVD and Blu-ray) is a 1971 international co-production spaghetti Western. It was shot in Madrid with Robert Shaw, Telly Savalas, Stella Stevens and Martin Landau.

It was released on blu-ray on 18 August 2015. The film was retitled A Town Called Hell for US release as the word "bastard" was thought offensive.

Plot
During the Mexican Revolution a small town is presided over by a tyrant (Telly Savalas) who commands a grizzled outlaw (Al Lettieri) and his men. Also in town is a priest (Robert Shaw) with a violent past, who has abandoned his clerical duties. A widow (Stella Stevens) arrives with her faithful servant (Dudley Sutton) promising to pay $20,000 in gold if the man who killed her husband is found and delivered to her. Further violence erupts when a brutal army Colonel (Martin Landau) arrives on the scene searching for an elusive rebel leader. The colonel and the priest knew each other years before.

Cast

References

External links
 

1971 films
Mexican Revolution films
1971 Western (genre) films
British Western (genre) films
Spanish Western (genre) films
English-language Spanish films
Films directed by Robert Parrish
Films shot in Almería
Films set in 1895
Films set in Mexico
1971 drama films
1970s English-language films
1970s British films